The  public joint stock company Ilyushin Aviation Complex, operating as Ilyushin or as Ilyushin Design Bureau, is a former Soviet and now a Russian aircraft manufacturer and design bureau, founded in 1933 by Sergey Vladimirovich Ilyushin. Soviet/Russian nomenclature identifies aircraft from Ilyushin with the prefix "Il-". Ilyushin has its head office in Aeroport District, Northern Administrative Okrug, Moscow.

History
Ilyushin was established under the Soviet Union. Its operations began on 13 January 1933, by order of P. I. Baranov, People's Commissar of the Heavy Industry and the Head of the Main Department of Aviation Industry. 

In 1970, the position of chief designer was taken by G. V. Novozhilov

In 2006 the Russian government merged Ilyushin with Mikoyan, Irkut, Sukhoi, Tupolev, and Yakovlev under a new company named United Aircraft Corporation.

In July 2014 it was reported that Ilyushin and Myasishchev would merge to form the United Aircraft Corporation business unit Transport Aircraft.

Subsidiaries and divisions
Aviation Industries Ilyushin is a subsidiary established in 1992 to act as Ilyushin's marketing and customer service arm.

Ilyushin Finance Co is a dedicated leasing and finance subsidiary that provides financial services for Ilyushin as well as other manufacturers.

See also

 List of Ilyushin aircraft
 List of military aircraft of the Soviet Union and the CIS

References

External links

 
United Aircraft Corporation
Aircraft manufacturers of Russia
Aircraft manufacturers of Uzbekistan
Aircraft manufacturers of the Soviet Union
Companies based in Moscow
Russian brands
Vehicle manufacturing companies established in 1933
1933 establishments in Russia
Design bureaus